Sami Aittokallio (born 6 August 1992) is a Finnish professional ice hockey goaltender who currently plays for Bietigheim Steelers of the Deutsche Eishockey Liga (DEL). He has formerly played with the Colorado Avalanche of the National Hockey League (NHL)

Playing career
Aittokallio was selected in the fourth round, 107th overall by the Colorado Avalanche in the 2010 NHL Entry Draft. Despite ranked as the number one European Goalie before the draft, he was the seventh goaltender taken.

In the 2009–10 season, Aittokallio made his debut in the SM-liiga as a 17-year-old playing in one game for Ilves. As well as representing Ilves in junior, Aittokallio spent a portion of the season on loan with Lempäälän Kisa in the Mestis league. On 12 April 2010, Aittokallio signed a two-year contract extension to remain with Ilves, his original team as a youth. In each season, he continued to split the year between Ilves youth team, LeKi and in the 2010–11 SM-liiga season, he played a career high 16 games for 5 wins.

After fulfilling his junior eligibility and his commitment to Ilves, Aittokallio was signed to a three-year entry level contract with the Avalanche on 11 May 2012.

After 26 games with the Monsters, Aittokallio received his first NHL recall to the Avalanche during the lockout shortened 2012–13 season, to fill the back-up position after an injury to starting goaltender Semyon Varlamov on 9 April 2013. On 11 April 2013, he made his NHL debut against the Los Angeles Kings, becoming the youngest since Marc Denis to start for the Avalanche. Aittokallio failed to complete the game after suffering from dehydration with the game tied midway through the third period, and was replaced in the eventual shootout loss by veteran Jean-Sébastien Giguère.

In the 2014–15 season, Aittokallio suffered from injury and indifferent form, playing with the Monsters and the Fort Wayne Komets of the ECHL.

Despite being tendered a qualifying offer by the Avalanche, Aittokallio opted to return to Finland to further his development in signing a two-year contract with Liiga club, Oulun Kärpät on 2 July 2015. Later in the off-season on 25 August 2015, it was announced that Aittokallio agreed to a one-year contract to keep within Avalanche organization, with a European clause allowing the continuance of his contract with Kärpät.

After two seasons with Kärpät, Aittokallio left the club and Finland in signing a one-year deal with Czech club, HC Sparta Praha of the Czech Extraliga on May 13, 2017. In the 2017–18 season, Aittokallio had a successful stint the Czech Republic, collecting 15 wins in a starting role through 28 games.

On April 13, 2018, Aittokallio returned to the Finnish Liiga, signing a one-year deal with his third top flight Finnish club, Vaasan Sport. In the 2018–19 season, Aittokallio was unable to reproduce the heights of previous seasons statistically, collecting 9 wins in 30 games and finishing with a 3.10 goals against average as Sport narrowly missed out on the Wild Card round.

Having left Sport, Aittokallio agreed to a two-year contract with his fourth Liiga outfit, Ässät Pori, on May 10, 2019.

Following two seasons with Ässät, Aittokallio left the Liiga, in signing a one-year deal with newly promoted German club, Bietigheim Steelers of the DEL, on 5 July 2021.

International play

 

Aittokallio was first selected to represent Finland at the 2009 World U-17 Hockey Challenge tournament organised by Hockey Canada. With an understrength team, Aittokallio mirrored the Finnish team and went winless in three games for the tournament to finish tenth out of ten. Touted for his hockey intelligence, good reflexes and athleticism, Aittokallio was selected to be first choice goaltender for Finland at the 2010 World Under-18 Championships in Minsk, Belarus. Sami, however, missed the tournament after suffering an ankle injury as Finland went on to defend their Bronze medal against Russia.

Aittokallio was selected to serve as the backup goaltender to Joni Ortio for Finland at the 2011 World Junior Championships. He made a solitary appearance in relief for Ortio, playing the third period of a 6–0 victory over Slovakia on 31 December 2010.

Aittokallio returned for the 2012 World Junior Championships, and was Finland's starting goaltender, with Christopher Gibson serving as his back-up. In Finland's semifinal against Sweden, Aittokallio made 56 saves, but ultimately, Finland lost 2–3 in a shootout. Aittokallio was named Finland's player of the game with his impressive performance. Following that loss, they played in the bronze medal game against Canada, which they lost 0–4. However, Finland recorded their best performance in the World Juniors since 2006 with their 4th-place exit and Aittokallio was subsequently selected in Finland's top three players for the tournament.

Career statistics

Regular season and playoffs

International

References

External links

 

1992 births
Living people
Ässät players
SC Bietigheim-Bissingen players
Colorado Avalanche draft picks
Colorado Avalanche players
Finnish ice hockey goaltenders
Fort Wayne Komets players
Ilves players
Lake Erie Monsters players
Oulun Kärpät players
HC Sparta Praha players
Ice hockey people from Tampere
Vaasan Sport players
Finnish expatriate ice hockey players in the Czech Republic
Finnish expatriate ice hockey players in Germany
Finnish expatriate ice hockey players in the United States